Contessa ( Countess) is a 2018 Philippine revenge drama television series directed by Albert Langitan, starring Glaiza de Castro in the title role. The series premiered on GMA Network's GMA Afternoon Prime and Sabado Star Power sa Hapon block and worldwide on GMA Pinoy TV from March 19 to September 8, 2018, succeeding the 1-year run of Ika-6 na Utos.

NUTAM (Nationwide Urban Television Audience Measurement) People in Television Homes ratings are provided by AGB Nielsen Philippines. The series ended, but its the 24th-week run, and with 147 episodes. It was replaced by Ika-5 Utos.

Series overview

Episodes

March 2018

April 2018

May 2018

June 2018

July 2018

August 2018

September 2018

References 

Lists of Philippine drama television series episodes